Broscodes karumicus is a species of beetle in the family Carabidae, the only species in the genus Broscodes. B. karumicus is found in central and south western Asia.

References

Broscinae
Monotypic Carabidae genera